M.T.V. Acharya (1920 – c. 1992) was a painter, illustrator and art educator, most famous for his work for the popular Indian children's magazine Chandamama.

Acharya won prizes for his painting during his student days in the Mysore Dasara Exhibition. Initially, he worked with Hindusthan Aircraft in Bangalore. His first painting exhibition was in Chennai in 1945. He joined the Telugu children's magazine Chandamama in 1947, and later became editor of its Kannada version. He painted many covers for Chandamama.

Acharya was art director of the Kannada daily Tai nadu between 1963 and 1965. Later, he founded his own art school in Bangalore, the Acharya Chitrakala Bhavan, which provided lessons and training in painting through correspondence.

Bibliography
Chandamama Art Book, an anthology of artwork by Acharya and other Chandamama artists.

References

External links
Chandamama Archives

Indian children's book illustrators
Journalists from Karnataka
Artists from Mysore
Painters from Karnataka
Year of death uncertain
1920 births
1990s deaths

kn:ಎಂ. ಟಿ. ವಿ. ಆಚಾರ್ಯ
ta:எம். டி. வி. ஆச்சார்யா